Between 1879 and 1916, tens of thousands of Indians moved to Fiji to work as indentured labourers, especially on sugarcane plantations. Repatriation of indentured Indians from Fiji began on 3 May 1892, when the British Peer brought 464 repatriated Indians to Calcutta. Various ships made similar journeys to Calcutta and Madras, concluding with Sirsa's 1951 voyage. In 1955 and 1956, three ships brought Indian labourers from Fiji to Sydney, from where the labourers flew to Bombay.

Conditions of return

Indentured Indians wishing to return to India were given two options. One was travel at their own expense and the other free of charge but subject to certain conditions. To obtain free passage back to India, labourers had to have been above age twelve upon arrival, completed at least five years of service and lived in Fiji for a total of ten consecutive years. A child born to these labourers in Fiji could accompany his or her parents or guardian back to India if he or she was under twelve.

Due to the high cost of returning at their own expense, most indentured immigrants returning to India left Fiji around ten to twelve years after arrival. Indeed, just over twelve years passed between the voyage of the first ship carrying indentured Indians to Fiji (the Leonidas, in 1879) and the first ship to take Indians back (the British Peer, in 1892).

Repatriation
Given the steady influx of ships carrying indentured Indians to Fiji up until 1916, repatriated Indians generally boarded these same ships on their return voyage. The total number of repatriates under the Fiji indenture system is recorded as 39,261, while the number of arrivals is said to have been 60,553. Because the return figure includes children born in Fiji, many of the indentured Indians never returned to India.

Direct return voyages by ship ceased after 1951. Instead, arrangements were made for flights from Sydney to Bombay, the first of which departed in July 1955. Labourers still travelled to Sydney by ship.

List of ship charters to India

List of ship charters to Sydney
The following ships brought labourers to Sydney.

References

See also
Girmityas
List of Indian indenture ships to Fiji
Indian indenture system

Fijian people of Indian descent
British India
Colony of Fiji
Indentured servitude
Labour in Fiji
Labour in India
Debt bondage
Demographic history of India
Fijian diaspora
Fiji sugar industry
.